Pseudobscura is a monotypic moth genus of the family Erebidae. Its only species, Pseudobscura karwaria, is known only from southwestern India and was described from Kawar. Both the genus and the species were first described by Michael Fibiger in 2011.

The wingspan is about 7.5 mm. The forewings are beige with a few brown areas near the termen and five black dots on the costa. The crosslines are invisible, except the terminal line, which is indicated by black interveinal dots. The fringes are grey. The hindwings are beige with a light brown terminal line. The fringes are grey. The underside is unicolorous brown and the hindwings are whitish beige without a discal spot.

References

Micronoctuini
Monotypic moth genera
Moths of Asia